Oechsle or Öchsle is a name of Germanic origin. The name may refer to:
Ferdinand Oechsle (1774–1852), German mechanical workshop owner, goldsmith, and inventor; eponym of the Oechsle scale
Gerhard Öchsle (contemporary), West German Olympic bobsledder
Oechsle scale for measuring the density of grape must; named for Ferdinand Oechsle
23995 Oechsle, a main belt asteroid